The Old Calendar Bulgarian Orthodox Church is an Old Calendarist church which follows the traditional Eastern Orthodox liturgical calendar, the Julian Calendar, and rejects ecumenism.

Structure and Parishes
The Old Calendar Bulgarian Church has one Bishop, 19 parishes, and 21 priests.

References

External links
Official Website
Ecclesiological Position of the Old Calendar Orthodox Church of Bulgaria, by Bishop Photii of Triaditsa
Torna a Chiese Ortodosse (in Italian)
Administration-Old Calendar Orthodox Church of Bulgaria on the Holy Synod in Resistance website

Eastern Orthodoxy in Bulgaria
Old Calendarist church bodies and jurisdictions
1968 in Christianity
20th-century Eastern Orthodoxy